Henri-Louis Empaytaz (1790–1853),  was a Protestant theologian. He was born and died in Geneva.

After Napoleon Bonaparte's downfall in 1814 and the general disillusionment with the ideals of the French Revolution, Empaytaz was a leading member of Le Réveil (The Awakening).

Biography
He was one of the first in the Protestant church where ideas, excitement and denials of the French Revolution, had died in France and Switzerland in the years 1814 to 1816, believed the ground so thoroughly cleaned of all liberal aspirations, they could, and that they should return, in religious matters, to the pure teachings of the sixteenth century.

In his view the Church in Geneva had lost its way and that the dogma of the divinity of Christ had been removed from the symbol of Ministers in Geneva. He joined other pastoralists César Malan, Guers, Ami Bost and other no less absolute in their beliefs, and desiring to live pure lives and they taught that the absolute truth of all that is written in the Bible. This movement was called Le Réveil (The Awakening)

His ideas had a profound effect on Alexander I of Russia and for a time he became a confidant of the emperor's most secret thoughts. Through his contact with the Russian Emperor he believed that he and Madam von Krüdener were in part responsible for the religious aspects of the Holy Alliance.

See also
Louis Gaussen
Adolphe Monod

Notes

References
 Endonote:

Attribution
 

1790 births
1853 deaths
Theologians from the Republic of Geneva
Swiss Protestant theologians
19th-century Protestant theologians